Our Secret Weapon: The Truth is a public affairs program broadcast on the DuMont Television Network from October 22, 1950 to April 17, 1951 and hosted by conservative commentators Leo Cherne and Ralph de Toledano.

Production
Our Secret Weapon: The Truth had its origins in the Freedom House radio program Our Secret Weapon (1942–43), a CBS Radio series hosted by Rex Stout, which was created to counter Axis shortwave radio propaganda broadcasts during World War II.

The concept was revived during the Korean War as a weekly series that would "answer Communist lies about us" with testimony from special guests. The program featured conservative commentators Leo Cherne and Ralph de Toledano.

See also
List of programs broadcast by the DuMont Television Network
List of surviving DuMont Television Network broadcasts

References

Bibliography
David Weinstein, The Forgotten Network: DuMont and the Birth of American Television (Philadelphia: Temple University Press, 2004) 
Alex McNeil, Total Television, Fourth edition (New York: Penguin Books, 1980) 
Tim Brooks and Earle Marsh, The Complete Directory to Prime Time Network TV Shows, Third edition (New York: Ballantine Books, 1964)

External links

DuMont historical website

DuMont Television Network original programming
1950 American television series debuts
1951 American television series endings
Black-and-white American television shows
Lost television shows
DuMont news programming